The Journal of Injury and Violence Research is an open-access peer-reviewed medical journal covering clinical practice in traumatology. The journal is indexed by PubMed, CINAHL, ProQuest, SocINDEX, SafetyLit, and Index Medicus/MEDLINE. It is published biannually by the Kermanshah University of Medical Sciences in  Kermanshah, Iran.

External links 
 
Biannual journals
Emergency medicine journals
Publications established in 2009
English-language journals
Violence journals